FK Fatran Dolná Tižina is a Slovak association football club located in Dolná Tižina. It currently plays in Majstrovstvá regiónu.

Colors and badge 
Its colors are blue and white or yellow-white.

References

External links
Dolná Tižina official website 

Football clubs in Slovakia
Association football clubs established in 2000
2000 establishments in Slovakia